You Are My Sunshine, also known as Silent Separation, is a 2015 Chinese romantic drama film starring Huang Xiaoming and Yang Mi. It was released on April 30, 2015. The movie is based on the novel Silent Separation written by Gu Man. A 2015 Chinese television series, My Sunshine, is based on the same novel.

Plot
In their university days, Zhao Mosheng fell in love at first sight with law student He Yichen. Through various incidents where Mosheng "stalked" Yichen on campus, Mosheng's cheerful personality charmed Yichen, and they slowly became college sweethearts. When Yichen's foster sister Yimei challenged Mosheng for Yichen's attention, Mosheng turned directly to Yichen for clarification, but did not expect to receive a cold response from him. Mistaking that Yichen and Yimei are a couple, Mosheng followed her father's arrangements and moved to the United States to continue her studies. Seven years later, Mosheng - who is now a professional photographer - returns to China, and coincidentally bumps into the unforgettable Yichen. Since the seven years they broke up, many people stand in the way of these star-crossed lovers: foster-sister Yimei; Mosheng's marriage in United States; the unrelentingly infatuated ex-husband Ying Hui; as well as the financial grudges between the couple's fathers. All these situations continue to affect the two former lovers, but instead, these misunderstandings and challenges give them a better comprehension of the love they have missed over the past seven years.

Cast

Reception

Box office
The film opened in China on April 30, 2015 and earned $37.68 million from 180,513 screenings and 6.7 million admissions in its opening weekend, debuting at number two at the Chinese box office behind Furious 7.

Critical response
The film was criticized for its lack of cinematic technique, artistic and chemistry between its leads. On Variety, Maggie Lee said the film "feels like a puzzle with half the pieces missing."

References

2015 romantic drama films
Chinese romantic drama films
Le Vision Pictures films
Films based on Chinese novels
2010s Mandarin-language films